David Julian Shipley (born June 10, 1963) is an American journalist, book author, and the editorial page editor at The Washington Post. He is the former executive editor of The New Republic.

Life and career
Shipley graduated with a bachelor's degree in English from Williams College. In 1986, he worked as an editorial assistant at Simon & Schuster in New York City. 

In 1990, Shipley worked as an assigning editor for the Op-Ed page at The New York Times. From 1993 to 1995, he was the executive editor of The New Republic. 

From 1995 to 1997, Shipley served in the Clinton administration as Special Assistant to the President and Senior Presidential Speechwriter.

After, from 1998 to 1999, Shipley worked as a deputy editor of The New York Times Magazine's Millennium Project, later becoming a senior editor for the magazine from 1999 to 2000.

In 2003, Shipley became an Op-Ed page editor for The New York Times'''  Opinions section. He was later promoted to the section's editorial page editor in 2007. That same year, 

In 2007, he co-wrote with Will Schwalbe the book Send: The Essential Guide to Email for Office and Home (republished under the title Send: Why People Email So Badly and How To Do It Better), published by Alfred A., Knopf.

Shipley is a former executive editor of Bloomberg View, who oversaw its editorial page and its associated columnists and op-ed contributors. He was chosen for this position in December 2010 and jointly launched Bloomberg View with James P. Rubin in May 2011. 

In July 2022, Shipley became The Washington Post'''s editorial page editor, overseeing the newspaper's Opinions section. He succeeded Fred Hiatt, who died from cardiac arrest in December 2021.

Personal life
Shipley married Naomi Wolf in 1993. The couple had two children: a son and a daughter. Shipley and Wolf divorced in 2005.

References

External links

1963 births
Living people
The New York Times editors
American magazine editors
American political consultants
American speechwriters
New York (state) Democrats
United States presidential advisors
Clinton administration personnel
Williams College alumni
Watson Fellows
Journalists from Portland, Oregon
Catlin Gabel School alumni
20th-century American journalists
American male journalists